Vladimír Merta (born 20 January 1946 in Prague, Czechoslovakia) is a Czech folk singer-songwriter. He was also journalist, writer, photographer, architect, filmmaker and author of film music. He recorded many solo albums. In 2011 he released album Ponorná řeka with rock band Etc....

Discography
 Ballades de Prague (1969)
 Pravda o Marii (recorded 1970, unreleased)
 P.S. (1978)
 Vladimír Merta 1 (1989)
 Vladimír Merta 2 (1989)
 Struny ve větru (1989)
 Hodina vlka (1990)
 Chtít chytit vítr (1992)
 Bití rublem (1992)
 Svátky trpělivosti (1992)
 Sefardské inspirace (1996; with Jana Lewitová)
 Nebuď nikdy sám (1997)
 Obrázky v kartách (1998)
 Svátky trpělivosti (1999)
 Mít míň je víc (1999)
 Ametysty (2000)
 Bývaly časy (2001)
 Drobné lži (2003)
 Filmy v hlavě (2004)
 Jánošík (2007)
 Ve tmě mě zanechte... (2008; with Jana Lewitová; Czech versions of John Dowland's songs)
 LIVE / Malostranská beseda 1988 (2010)
 Ponorná řeka (2011; with Etc...)
 Včerejší vydání (2011; with Jan Hrubý)

References

External links

 Official website
 Vladimír Merta on ČSFD
 Vladimír Merta on IMDb
 List of works
 Interview with Vladimír Merta

1946 births
Living people
Czech male writers
Czechoslovak male singers
Czech guitarists
Male guitarists
20th-century Czech male singers
Czech male composers
Czech film directors
Czech singer-songwriters
Czech film score composers
Male film score composers
21st-century Czech male singers